Ruthenium pentafluoride is the inorganic compound with the empirical formula RuF5. This green volatile solid has rarely been studied but is of interest as a binary fluoride of ruthenium, i.e. a compound containing only Ru and F. It is sensitive toward hydrolysis.  Its structure consists of Ru4F20 tetramers, as seen in the isostructural platinum pentafluoride.  Within the tetramers, each Ru adopts octahedral molecular geometry, with two bridging fluoride ligands.

Ruthenium pentafluoride reacts with iodine to give ruthenium(III) fluoride.

References

Ruthenium compounds
Fluorides
Platinum group halides